Gugy is a surname. Notable people with this surname include:

 Bartholomew Gugy (1796–1876), Canadian politician
 Conrad Gugy (1734–1786), Dutch-Canadian politician
 Louis Gugy (1770–1840), Canadian politician